Elliott John Tittensor (born 3 November 1989) is an English actor, best known for playing the role of Carl Gallagher in the Channel 4 comedy-drama series Shameless (2004–2013).

Career
Elliott Tittensor and his twin brother, Luke, appeared in the soap Brookside.

In the first season of Channel 4 series Shameless, the Tittensor twins shared the role of Carl Gallagher. Elliott continued playing the role of Carl after Luke left the show.

He currently stars as Ser Erryk Cargyll in HBO's House of the Dragon, alongside his twin brother who plays the role of Ser Arryk Cargyll. They have appeared in the following episodes of the show:

 "The Heirs of the Dragon" (2022)
 "The Princess and the Queen" (2022) 
 "The Lord of the Tides" (2022) 
 "The Green Council" (2022)

Personal life
Elliott  Tittensor is the identical twin brother of Luke Tittensor. They are both from Heywood, Greater Manchester and attended Heywood Community High School. He was in a relationship with Kaya Scodelario from late 2009 to early 2014. Their relationship was publicised when Scodelario supported Tittensor after his arrest for an incident where he almost killed someone while driving an uninsured car and causing the victim serious injuries and blindness. Tittensor pleaded guilty to driving without insurance and was successfully sued for damages arising out of his role in the incident.

Filmography

Film

Television

References

External links

1989 births
Living people
British identical twins
English male child actors
Identical twin male actors
People from Heywood, Greater Manchester
English twins
English male soap opera actors
Male actors from Manchester
English male film actors
English male television actors
21st-century English male actors